Iohexol, sold under the trade name Omnipaque among others, is a contrast agent used for X-ray imaging. This includes when visualizing arteries, veins, ventricles of the brain, the urinary system, and joints, as well as during computed tomography (CT scan). It is given by mouth, injection into a vein, or into a body cavity.

Side effects include vomiting, skin flushing, headache, itchiness, kidney problems, and low blood pressure. Less commonly allergic reactions or seizures may occur. Allergies to povidone-iodine or shellfish do not affect the risk of side effects more than other allergies. Use in the later part of pregnancy may cause hypothyroidism in the baby. Iohexol is an iodinated non-ionic radiocontrast agent. It is in the low osmolar family.

Iohexol was approved for medical use in 1985. It is on the World Health Organization's List of Essential Medicines.

Chemistry
The osmolality of iohexol ranges from 322 mOsm/kg—approximately 1.1 times that of blood plasma—to 844 mOsm/kg, almost three times that of blood. Despite this difference, iohexol is still considered a low-osmolality contrast agent; the osmolality of older agents, such as diatrizoate, may be more than twice as high.

Adverse effects
The most common side effects after intravenous injections are: pain at the site of injection (3%), blurring of vision (2%), nausea (2%), arrhythmia (2%), taste pervertion (1%), hypotension (0.7%), and vomiting (0.7%).

Society and culture

Naming
It is sold under the brand names Omnipaque,. It is also sold as a density gradient medium under the names Accudenz, Histodenz, and Nycodenz.

Available forms
It is available in various concentrations, from 140 to 350 milligrams of iodine per milliliter. Iohexol can given as intrathecal, intravascular, oral, rectal, intraarticular, or into the body cavity.

References

External links 
 
 

Benzamides
Iodoarenes
Radiocontrast agents
World Health Organization essential medicines
Wikipedia medicine articles ready to translate